Dennis L. Remmert (November 1, 1938 – February 15, 2020) was an American football player who played with the Buffalo Bills. He played college football at the University of Northern Iowa.

He died on February 15, 2020, in Waterloo, Iowa at age 81.

References

1938 births
2020 deaths
American football linebackers
Northern Iowa Panthers football players
Buffalo Bills players
Players of American football from Iowa
People from Tama County, Iowa
American Football League players